Joan E. Donoghue (born December 12, 1957) is an American lawyer, international legal scholar, former U.S. State Department official, and the current president of the International Court of Justice (ICJ). She was first elected to the court in 2010, re-elected in 2014, and elected by the ICJ judges to be president of the ICJ in 2021. She is the third woman to be elected to the ICJ and the first American woman elected as president of the Court.

Education and career 
Donoghue graduated from the University of California, Santa Cruz, with honors degrees in Russian studies and biology in 1978. She subsequently received her Juris Doctor from the University of California, Berkeley School of Law in 1981. From 1981 to 1984, she was an attorney in private practice at Covington & Burling, focusing on federal courts and litigation.

In the 1980s, Donoghue acted as an attorney-advisor for the U.S. in Nicaragua v. United States. She was the general counsel of Freddie Mac from 2003 to 2005, and served as Principal Deputy Legal Adviser at the United States State Department from 2007 to 2010, including as State Department Acting Legal Adviser in 2009. She previously served as the Office of the Legal Adviser's Deputy Legal Adviser (2000–2001) Assistant Legal Adviser for Economic and Business Affairs (1994–1999); African Affairs (1993–1994); and Oceans, Environment, and Science (1989–1991).  She also served as Deputy General Counsel of the U.S. Treasury Department, overseeing all aspects of the Department's work, including international financial institutions.

International Court of Justice
Donoghue was elected to the ICJ on September 9, 2010, to fill the place left vacant by the resignation of Thomas Buergenthal. Pursuant to the Statute of the International Court of Justice, Donoghue completed the remainder of the nine-year term for which Buergenthal had been elected, which expired on February 5, 2015.

Donoghue's name had been the only nomination for this ICJ vacancy received by the secretary-general within the specified time. In the General Assembly, Donoghue received 159 votes out of 167 valid ballots with 8 abstentions. In the Security Council, she received all 15 votes. Donoghue was sworn in as a member of the ICJ on September 13, 2010.

Donoghue was only the fourth woman elected to be a member of the court since 1945. Of the court's 15 members, three are now female (the others are Xue Hanqin and Julia Sebutinde). 

In 2014, Donoghue was nominated for a second term on the ICJ by the U.S. National Group of the Permanent Court of Arbitration (The Hague), and was easily re-elected with 156 votes in the first round of voting at the International Court of Justice judges election, 2014.

As an ICJ judge, she issued a dissenting opinion in the case Legal Consequences of the Separation of the Chagos Archipelago from Mauritius in 1965, in which the ICJ issued an advisory opinion in 2017 on the Chagos Archipelago sovereignty dispute between the United Kingdom and Mauritius in response to a request from the United Nations General Assembly. The Court deemed the United Kingdom's separation of the Chagos Islands from the rest of Mauritius in 1965, leading to the expulsion of the Chagossians when both were colonial territories, to be unlawful. Judge Donoghue dissented from the majority opinion, reasoning that:I consider that the Advisory Opinion has the effect of circumventing the absence of United Kingdom consent to judicial settlement of the bilateral dispute between the United Kingdom and Mauritius regarding sovereignty over the Chagos Archipelago and thus undermines the integrity of the Court’s judicial function. For this reason, I believe that the Court should have exercised its discretion to decline to give the Advisory Opinion.Bowcott, Owen (25 February 2019). "UN court rejects UK's claim of sovereignty over Chagos Islands". The Guardian. Retrieved 26 February 2019.Donoghue was elected 26th president of the court on February 8, 2021, succeeding Abdulqawi Yusuf, for a term of three years. She is the second woman to hold the post (alongside Rosalyn Higgins) and third American (alongside Stephen Schwebel and Green Hackworth).

References

External links
 Judge Donoghue's biography on the website of the International Court of Justice (retrieved 2013-03-26)
 Lawyering for Peace, a lecture by Judge Joan E. Donoghue in the Lecture Series of the United Nations Audiovisual Library of International Law (retrieved 2013-03-26)

1957 births
21st-century American women
American judges of United Nations courts and tribunals
American women judges
American women lawyers
American lawyers
International Court of Justice judges
Living people
People associated with Covington & Burling
Presidents of the International Court of Justice
UC Berkeley School of Law alumni
University of California, Santa Cruz alumni